The Bale shrew (Crocidura bottegoides) is a species of mammal in the family Soricidae. It is endemic to Ethiopia, in the Bale Mountains of the Ethiopian Highlands. Its natural habitats are subtropical or tropical moist montane forests and high-elevation grassland.

References
 Hutterer, R. & Lavrenchenko, L. 2004.  Crocidura bottegoides.   2006 IUCN Red List of Threatened Species.   Downloaded on 30 July 2007.

Crocidura
Endemic fauna of Ethiopia
Mammals of Ethiopia
Bale Mountains
Fauna of the Ethiopian Highlands
Endangered animals
Endangered biota of Africa
Mammals described in 1990
Taxonomy articles created by Polbot